Bunroku Shishi (a pen name for Toyoo Iwata; b. July 1, 1893, Yokohama; d. Dec. 13, 1969) was a Japanese writer and director of the Bungakuza Theater in Tokyo.

In 1922 he traveled to France to study modern French theater, and worked in the atelier of Jacques Copeau.

Selected books

 Ecchan, (Little Etsuko, 1936)
 Ten'ya Wan'ya (Chaos, 1949)
 Jiyū Gakkō, (1950) Published in English in 2006 as School of Freedom by Lynne E. Riggs, .
 Yassa Mossa, (Helter-Skelter, 1952)
 Musume to Watashi, (My Daughter And I, 1956, was made into both a TV-series and a movie)
 Hakoneyama, (Mount Hakone, 1962)

References
牧村健一郎『獅子文六の二つの昭和』朝日新聞出版,　2009 (Makimura Kenichirō, Shishi Bunroku no futatsu no Shōwa, Asahi Shinbun Shuppan, 2009)

External links

 J'Lit | Authors : Bunroku Shishi | Books from Japan 

Japanese writers
1893 births
1969 deaths
People from Yokohama
Recipients of the Order of Culture